Le retour de l'enfant prodigue (The Return of the Prodigal Son) is a short story by André Gide. Gide wrote the story in early 1907.

It is based on the Biblical parable of the prodigal son.  The story begins with the prodigal son returning home, not repentant, but hungry, poor, and frustrated at having failed to achieve his goal. He engages in dialogues with his father, mother, and elder brother.  In Gide's version of the parable, the prodigal has a younger brother, who is on the verge of also leaving home; the returned prodigal promises to join this brother when he has made good.

The story draws upon Gide's own life experiences, and his struggles with his Protestant upbringing.
In Wallace Fowlie's words, "Gide is persistently asking the question whether the Law is suitable for all men".

The story has also been adapted for the stage and performed in Paris, where incidental music for it was written by Henri Sauguet in 1933.

Footnotes

1907 short stories
French short stories
Works by André Gide